Little Ring Mountain, also called Little Ring Peak, is a tuya in the Pacific Ranges of the Coast Mountains in southwestern British Columbia, Canada. It lies at the head of the Squamish and Soo Rivers. Part of the Mount Cayley volcanic field, its most recent eruption most likely occurred during the Fraser Glaciation.

This peak is so-called because it is similar to the larger and officially named Ring Mountain just to the south.

See also
 List of volcanoes in Canada
 Volcanism of Canada
 Volcanism of Western Canada

References

External links
 Catalogue of Canadian volcanoes: Little Ring Mountain

Two-thousanders of British Columbia
Volcanoes of British Columbia
Subduction volcanoes
Pacific Ranges
Sea-to-Sky Corridor
Tuyas of Canada
Mount Cayley volcanic field